Mavaluy-e Sofla (also Romanized as Mavālūy-e Soflá'; also known as Mavālū-ye Soflá) is a village in Sarajuy-ye Sharqi Rural District, Saraju District, Maragheh County, East Azerbaijan Province, Iran. At the 2006 census, its population was 21, in 4 families.

References 

Towns and villages in Maragheh County